Guillermo del Riego Gordón (born September 11, 1958) is a Spanish sprint canoer who competed from the mid-1970s to the mid-1980s. Competing in three Summer Olympics, he won a silver medal in the K-2 500 m event at Moscow in 1980.

References
Sports-reference.com profile

1958 births
Canoeists at the 1976 Summer Olympics
Canoeists at the 1980 Summer Olympics
Canoeists at the 1984 Summer Olympics
Living people
Olympic canoeists of Spain
Olympic silver medalists for Spain
Spanish male canoeists
Olympic medalists in canoeing
Medalists at the 1980 Summer Olympics
20th-century Spanish people